Viktor Vitaliyovych Tsyhankov (born 15 November 1997) is a professional footballer who plays as a midfielder for La Liga club Girona. Born in Israel, he represents the Ukraine national team.

Club career

Dynamo Kyiv
Born in Nahariya, Israel, where his father Vitaliy Tsyhankov played as a footballer, Tsyhankov moved to Ukraine when he was very young. Tsyhankov is a product of the Nyva Vinnytsia and Dynamo Kyiv academy systems. His first coach was Mykola Zahoruyko.

He made his debut in the Ukrainian Premier League for Dynamo on 14 August 2016 against FC Stal Kamianske. During the 2018–19 season Tsyhankov was recognized as a player of the month in the Ukrainian Premier League on three occasions—March 2018, December 2018, and April 2019.

Girona
On 17 January 2023, Tsyhankov joined La Liga side Girona, signing a contract until June 2027 with the Spanish club. The transfer reportedly commanded a €5 million fee, with a 50% sell-on clause in favour of Dynamo Kyiv.

International career
Tsyhankov got his first call-up to the senior Ukraine side for 2018 FIFA World Cup qualifiers against Turkey and Kosovo in October 2016 but did not appear in either match. He made his senior debut in Ukraine's World Cup qualifying match against Finland the following November, coming on in the 83rd minute.

Career statistics

Club

International

Scores and results list Ukraine's goal tally first, score column indicates score after each Tsyhankov goal.

Honours
Dynamo Kyiv
Ukrainian Premier League: 2020–21
Ukrainian Cup: 2019–20, 2020–21
Ukrainian Super Cup: 2018, 2019, 2020
Individual
 Golden talent of Ukraine: 2017, 2018, 2019
 Ukrainian Footballer of the Year: 2018
 Ukrainian Premier League Player of the Year: 2018–19
 Ukrainian Premier League Footballer of the Year: 2020

References

External links 

1997 births
Living people
Ukrainian footballers
Footballers from Nahariya
Association football midfielders
Ukraine international footballers
Ukraine under-21 international footballers
Ukraine youth international footballers
UEFA Euro 2020 players
Ukrainian Premier League players
FC Dynamo Kyiv players
Girona FC players
Ukrainian expatriate footballers
Ukrainian expatriate sportspeople in Spain
Expatriate footballers in Spain